David Henry Glass (August 8, 1887 - May 1979) was a longtime Democratic member of the Mississippi House of Representatives from Attala County.

Biography 
David Henry Glass was born on August 8, 1887, in Sallis, Mississippi. His father Henry Clay Glass was from Texas. He was a lawyer, farmer, and timber grower. He fought in and was a veteran of World War I. He was a Democratic member of the Mississippi House of Representatives, representing Attala County, from 1920 to 1936, from 1940 to 1948, and from 1956 to 1960. While living in Kosciusko, he died in May 1979.

References 

1887 births
1979 deaths
People from Kosciusko, Mississippi
Democratic Party members of the Mississippi House of Representatives
Mississippi lawyers